Hartley Independent School District is a public school district based in the community of Hartley, Texas (USA).

The district has one school that serves students in grades pre-kindergarten through twelve.

In 2009, the school district was rated "academically acceptable" by the Texas Education Agency.

References

External links
Hartley ISD

School districts in Hartley County, Texas